Lyubov Kharitonovna Andreeva (Любо́вь Харито́новна Андре́ева; 29 April 1942 – 15 April 2021) was a Soviet and Russian poet and journalist.

Life and work
Her parents worked in the kolkhoz. Her father died in World War II.

In 1960, she graduated from the tenth grade of Mostovskaya Secondary school and moved in Kurgan, where she worked on the construction of residential buildings.

In December 1965, she joined the Communist Party of the Soviet Union.

In 1966 she entered the correspondence department of the Maxim Gorky Literature Institute, from which she graduated in 1972.

As a journalist, she began her career in October 1966 in the editorial office of the newspaper Young Leninist (a newspaper of the Kurgan Regional Committee of the Komsomol).

Since 11 October 1971, a member of the Union of Soviet Writers, after the collapse of the Joint Venture of the USSR - a member of the Union of Russian Writers.

In February 1971, she was accepted as the head of the literary circle at the Palace of Culture of the  plant, then, from June 1973, she was the editor of the radio broadcasting of the Kurgankhimmash plant. In 1977,  and Kurgankhimmash plants were reorganized into Kurganarmkhimmash software. On 15 November 1989, the Kurganarmkhimmash Production Association was abolished, and the plants became independent again. She continued her work as an editor of the Rebar Plant radio broadcasting. In January 1991, she was appointed editor of the factory newspaper Mayak. In 1993, the Kurgan Rebar Plant was corporatized and reorganized into JSC "Ikar" - Kurgan Pipeline Valve Plant".

In April 2006, she retired.

Lyubov Kharitonovna Andreeva died on the morning of 15 April 2021 in a hospital in Kurgan, Kurgan Oblast. She is buried in the New Rjabkovskoe cemetery there.

Published works
Many of Andreeva's poems are dedicated to the working class and the nature of the Kurgan Oblast.

Her poems were published in the newspapers Literaturnaya Gazeta, Young Leninist, Moskovskij Komsomolets, magazines Tekhnika Molodezhi, Siberian Krai, almanacs Poetry and Tobol, anthologies, were transmitted by the All Union First Programme radio and regional radio.

Some of her poems have been translated into Polish, published in the newspaper Głos Pomorza, translator .

Published works:

Awards and honours
 Medal of the FNPR "100 years of Trade unions of Russia"
 Commemorative medal "100 years of the Great October Socialist Revolution" (KPRF)
 The Udarnik of Communist Labor, March 16, 1970
 Letter of thanks from the Head of the city Government of the Mayor of Kurgan, August 2002
 Badge "Veteran of the plant" of JSC "Ikar", November 18, 2004
 Kurgan City Award "Recognition", 2004
 Diploma of the literary contest "PEACE AND FATHERLAND", 2020

Bibliography

References

1942 births
2021 deaths
People from Kurgan Oblast
Burials in Kurgan, Kurgan Oblast
Soviet women poets
Russian women poets
Soviet journalists
Russian women journalists
Russian newspaper editors
Communist Party of the Soviet Union members
Maxim Gorky Literature Institute alumni